The Evangelical Lutheran Church of Costa Rica (Evangelisch-Lutherische Kirche in Costa Rica in German, Iglesia Evangélica Luterana de Costa Rica in Spanish) is a German-speaking parish of Lutheran faith in Costa Rica. It is a member of the Lutheran World Federation, which it joined in 1968.

Lutheran denominations
Lutheran World Federation members